Bonn is a city borough (Stadtbezirk) of Bonn, Germany. It has a population of 155,235 (2020).

Subdivisions
Bonn is composed of the following sub-districts:
 Auerberg
 Bonn-Castell
 Bonn-Zentrum
 Buschdorf
 Dottendorf
 Dransdorf
 Endenich
 Graurheindorf
 Gronau
 Ippendorf
 Kessenich
 Lessenich/Meßdorf
 Nordstadt
 Poppelsdorf
 Röttgen
 Südstadt
 Tannenbusch
 Ückesdorf
 Venusberg
 Weststadt

Twin towns – sister cities

Beuel is twinned with:
 Budafok-Tétény (Budapest), Hungary
 Oxford, England, United Kingdom

References

Urban districts and boroughs of Bonn